Acheilognathus barbatus is a species of freshwater ray-finned fish in the genus Acheilognathus.  It is endemic to the Mingjiang and Yangtze rivers in China.  Its common length is 4.0 cm.

References

Acheilognathus
Fish described in 1926
Cyprinid fish of Asia
Freshwater fish of China